Bhaktardoba is a Bazaar located in Barpeta district in the state of Assam, India. It is located on the banks of the Kaldia River. Nearby villages include Naligaon, Helochar Pam, Nalir Pam, Nalir Pathar, Kawaimari Block No 9, Kawaimari Block No 10, Pithadi Gaon and Pithadi Pam.

Demographics 
The Bhaktardoba comes under of Sarukhetri Assembly constituency (126), with a majority of inhabitants belonging to East Bengal-rooted Muslim. Hindu Assamese, Hindu Bengali are also inhabitant in Bhaktardoba.

Heath (Hospital) 
The Bhaktardoba Model Hospital that provides treatment to the people of Bhaktardoba as well as people from different parts of Barpeta district.

Education 
16+ Schools & 2 College are situated in Bhaktardoba.

Schools
  Paschim Paka Azad Memorial High School
 Paschim Paka Azad Memorial M.E Madrassa 
 Desh Bhakta M.E.School
 Deshbhakta Girls High School
 Naligaon H. Pre-Senior Madrassa
 D Deshbhakta Pre-Senior Madrassa
 N.K Girls High School
 Pithadi High School
 Red Rose Model School
 Modern English School (Bhaktardaba)
 Royal Academy
 Azad Jatiya Vidyalaya
 Excellent Academy (Bhaktardoba)
 Global Academy
 A.K Talent Academy (Bhaktardoba)
 Nine Star Golden Academy
 New Model Academy (DBS) Helocha
 Modern English School (Bhaktardaba)

Colleges
 Harendra Chitra Junior College, Bhaktardoba
 Harendra Chitra College, Bhaktardoba

Transport 
The Kayakuchi Naligaon Road connects the Bhaktardoba Bazaar with district. Public transport buses and mini buses are available which connects the district and the city Guwahati.

References 

Geography of Assam